The PokerStars Caribbean Adventure is an annual televised poker tournament. The event was first held in 2004 and was originally co-sponsored by PokerStars and the World Poker Tour. In 2008, the event moved from the WPT to the European Poker Tour. In 2010, the event was moved again and served as the inaugural event of the North American Poker Tour. In 2017 the tournament was the inaugural event of the new PokerStars Championship tour and renamed PokerStars Championship Bahamas. The name was changed back to the PCA for 2018 and the buy-in restored to $10,000.

In 2004, the event took place on the Royal Caribbean Voyager of the Seas cruise ship. For 15 years (from 2005 to 2019), the event took place at the Atlantis Paradise Island and after a three-year break, it returns to the Bahamas at the brand new Baha Mar Resort.

The 2011 PCA commenced on January 4, 2011. Over fifty events took place over ten days, including the main event with an estimated prize pool of $20 million. Players either buy into the main event directly for $10,300, or they may win their way into the event via satellites running on PokerStars and at the event. The main event final table was aired live on ESPN2, featuring commentary by James Hartigan and Daniel Negreanu.

John Dibella, a 43-year-old stock trader from New York, won the 2012 PCA for $1,775,000. Dibella won a live $1,000 satellite into the $10,000 Main Event and is the first amateur player to win the tournament.

In 2019, PokerStars announced that the PCA would be discontinued in 2020.

In April 2022, Pokerstars announces the return of the PCA and PSPC to the Bahamas in 2023 at a new location the Baha Mar Resort.

Main Event winners

High Roller winners

Super High Roller winners

References

External links
Official site
Official FAQ Page

PokerStars
European Poker Tour
Television shows about poker
Poker tournaments
Poker in North America